San Parteo Church or San Perteo Church is a Pisan-Romanesque church located in Corsica, France. It is a listed historical monument since 1886.

The edifice dates to the 11th and 12th century. It takes its name from the fifth century San Parteo, a saint of regional renown.

The church is described as having a "grandly sober style". It is built over a pagan cemetery and its lintel is said to be "decorated with a Middle Eastern motif; two lions guarding what is believed to be the Tree of Science in the Garden of Eden."

References

11th-century Roman Catholic church buildings in France
12th-century Roman Catholic church buildings in France
Churches in Corsica
Buildings and structures in Haute-Corse